Magdalena Jasek is a Polish fashion model.

Career 
Jasek was discovered by sending her photos to a Polish magazine twice at age 14. At the shoot, the photographer set her up with Marilyn Agency. During her school years she only worked in Paris for haute couture shows. When she was old enough to have a visa she started doing international fashion weeks; opening Celine, and walking for designers including Marc Jacobs, Alexander McQueen, Balenciaga, Louis Vuitton (for whom she also did an advertisement), Kenzo, Saint Laurent, Valentino, Maison Margiela, Giambattista Valli, Rag & Bone, Calvin Klein, Giorgio Armani, Givenchy, and Fendi. The next year, 2014, Elle Poland chose her as their "Model of the Year", and she appeared on a cover of Elle Brasil with Camille Rowe and Ysaunny Brito.

She appeared in an ensemble Prada campaign alongside models including Cindy Bruna, Amanda Murphy, Julia Bergshoeff, Anna Ewers, Lexi Boling, and Malaika Firth. For Opening Ceremony, she appeared in a Spike Jonze- and Jonah Hill-written play about fashion week called 100% Cotton, also starring Elle Fanning, Karlie Kloss, Dree Hemingway, Alia Shawkat, Catherine Keener, Bobby Cannavale, John Cameron Mitchell, and Rashida Jones.

References 

Living people
1993 births
Models from Warsaw
Polish female models
Select Model Management models
The Society Management models